Synechodes royalis is a moth in the family Brachodidae. It was described by Kallies in 2004. It is found in Myanmar.

References

Natural History Museum Lepidoptera generic names catalog

Brachodidae
Moths described in 2004